Turgel may refer to:

Türi, German name Turgel, a town in Järva County, Estonia
Gena Turgel (1923–2018), Polish author, educator and Holocaust survivor